Zinc finger protein 219 is a protein that in humans is encoded by the ZNF219 gene.

References

Further reading

External links 
 

Transcription factors